The  is dedicated to the literary scene in Kobe, Hyōgo Prefecture, Japan in the Meiji, Taishō, Shōwa, and Heisei periods. The museum opened in 2006 in the former Branch Memorial Chapel of Kwansei Gakuin University, a Meiji period building largely funded by John Kerr Branch, a scion and financier from Richmond, Virginia.

It is next to Ōji Zoo and across the street from a contemporary art gallery dedicated to the illustrator Yokoo Tadanori.

See also

Branch House
Japanese museums

References

External links
  

Museums in Kobe
Literary museums in Japan
Buildings of the Meiji period
Museums established in 2006
2006 establishments in Japan